Mirabella is a 2014 Philippine drama fantasy television series directed by Erick C. Salud, Jerome Chavez Pobocan, Jojo A. Saguin and Claudio "Tots" Sanchez-Mariscal IV, starring Julia Barretto in her first lead role, together with Enrique Gil, Sam Concepcion and Mika Dela Cruz. The series was aired on ABS-CBN's Primetime Bida evening block and worldwide on The Filipino Channel from March 24, 2014, to July 4, 2014, replacing Annaliza, and was replaced by Pure Love.

Synopsis
After joining a beauty contest, a beautiful woman named Daisy catches the attention of a judge.
Entangled in forbidden love and adultery, the judge's wife Olivia soon finds out about her husband's affair. In anger, Olivia turns to a ritual through a mysterious tree and curses Daisy by taking away her beauty. Like the very same tree used in the ritual, Daisy's skin took on the same exact wood-like appearance.

After her mother's death, Mira was named and raised by her aunt. The result of the illicit affair between her mother and the married judge, Mira was also affected by the curse; her skin wooden-like similar to her mother. Due to her appearance, she was often ridiculed and targeted by bullies. Despite the many hardships she faced, she continues to have a positive outlook of life; finding comfort from those who genuinely cares about her. Crushing on a boy who seem to accept her for who she is regardless of her curse, she is humiliated once more when he betrays her and sides with her bullies.

Bitter and overwhelmed from the constant torment, Mira vows revenge to all people who have hurt her. With the help of a mysterious flower that blooms through her mother's statue, she is able to temporarily break the curse. Using her now beautiful appearance, she pushes to become famous as a new aspiring model named 'Bella'.

Those who have agonised her will pay.

Cast and characters

Protagonist

 Julia Barretto as MiraBella "Bella" Arboleda Robles
 Enrique Gil as Jeremy Palmera
 Sam Concepcion as Terrence Laurel
 Mika Dela Cruz as Iris Flores Robles

Main cast
 Pokwang as Mimosa "Osang" Balete
 John Lapus as Rafael "Paeng" Amarillo
 Mylene Dizon as Olivia "Olive" Flores-Robles 
 James Blanco as Alfred Robles
 Gloria Diaz as Lucia Magnolia Flores

Supporting cast
 Arlene Muhlach as Dahlia
 Liza Diño as Aster Palmera-Laurel
 DJ Durano as Manuel Laurel

Extended cast
 Makisig Morales as Jefferson
 Alora Sasam as Marigold
 Diego Loyzaga as Dave Castillo
 Ryle Paolo Santiago as Raphael Guzman
 Paulo Angeles as Nico
 Alexa Macanan as Violet
 Noemi Oineza as Lilac
 Nikki Bagaporo as Jasmin Bonifacio
 Marinella Sevidal as Rose
 Jose Sarasola as Benson
 Marvin Yap as Adonis
 Greggy Santos as Edward Chavez

Guest cast
 Angel Jacob as Petunia
 Marina Benipayo as Zenia "Ms. Z"
 Dianne Medina as Holly
 DJ Chacha as Herself
 Lander Vera Perez as Anthony

Special participation
 Dimples Romana as Daisy Arboleda
 Alysson McBride as Young Mira / Bella Arboleda
 Veyda Inoval as Young Iris Robles
 Maliksi Morales as Young Jefferson
 Sofia Discher as Young Marigold
 Parjan Santos as Young Jeremy Palmera

Soundtrack
 Sabihin Mo Sa Akin - Klarisse de Guzman
 Kulang Ako Kung Wala Ka - Aiza Seguerra

Production
The series was first unveiled in May 2013 as an adaptation of Dominador Ad Castillo novel Cofradia. — The story centers on Cofradia, a young woman who is afraid to fall in love because of her dark complexion. With the help of a magic candle, she eventually transforms into a beautiful lady. The novel had film adaptations in 1953 and 1973.

However, due to criticisms over the material's alleged racism, Dreamscape announced in July 2013 that it had re-worked into a new series to feature an original story that is "equally exciting and equally beautiful."

Cast changes
Diego Loyzaga and Kiko Estrada were originally part of the main cast, but was later replaced by Enrique Gil and Sam Concepcion respectively. Estrada returned to Annaliza, while Loyzaga later remained as part of the series in a supporting antagonist role instead. Liza Soberano was also reported to be part of the series, but later became part of Got to Believe instead. Soberano was later replaced by Mika dela Cruz. Later on Soberano and Gil worked together in Forevermore.

This is a second time of Julia and Sam to appear on the show, since Walang Kapalit in 2007.

Reception

According to data from Kantar Media Philippines, Mirabella scored a national TV rating of 22% on its pilot episode on March 24, 2014. The highest rating was its final episode on July 4, 2014, scoring a 27.3%.

See also
List of programs broadcast by ABS-CBN
List of ABS-CBN drama series

References

ABS-CBN drama series
2014 Philippine television series debuts
2014 Philippine television series endings
Fantaserye and telefantasya
Philippine horror fiction television series
Philippine melodrama television series
Television series about revenge
Philippine supernatural television series
Television series by Dreamscape Entertainment Television
Filipino-language television shows
Television shows set in the Philippines